Dan Whitehurst (born 1948 in Los Banos, California), is a former California politician.
Whitehurst started college at age 16 and law school at age 20. He practiced law briefly and then worked for a time at his father's funeral home before entering politics in 1975.  He was mayor of Fresno, California from 1977 to 1985.

Civic career
He was a Fresno city council member from 1975 to 1977 and was the mayor of that city from 1977 to 1985. Whitehurst took the oath of office at 28 years of age when he became mayor of Fresno, making him the youngest mayor of a major city in the U.S. and the youngest mayor in the history of Fresno. This beat the former youngest mayor of Fresno, Gordon Dunn, by 8 years.

In 1982, Whitehurst ran against California Governor Jerry Brown for the Democratic nomination to the U.S. Senate. He came in fourth place with 167,574 votes (6.10%).

He did community activities like:
 1997-99 Chairman, Great Valley Center
 1993-94 Chairman, Fresno Metropolitan Projects Authority (Arts to Zoo Commission)
 1986–present Chairman, California Healthy Cities Steering Committee
 1986-87 Program Evaluator, Ford Foundation Innovations in Government Program
 1985-88 Executive Session on Community Policing, Harvard University
 Also served on various advisory committees for: Fresno State, Regional Medical Center, Central California Futures Institute, Boys and Girls Clubs, Fresno County Association for a UC Campus, Fresno Unified School District, Citizens for Community Enrichment (Arts to Zoo), Downtown Task Force (ULI Study)
 1977-85 Mayor of Fresno
 1975-77 Fresno City Council
 Board Member, National League of Cities; Chair, Public Safety Committee, U.S. Conference of Mayors; President, Mayors and Councilmembers Department, League of California Cities

After his tenure as mayor, Whitehurst practiced law and did other business over the years. He ran for Mayor of Fresno again in 2000 but lost to Republican Alan Autry.

References

External links

1948 births
Living people
Mayors of Fresno, California
California city council members
California Democrats
California lawyers
People from Los Banos, California
Saint Mary's College of California alumni
University of California, Hastings College of the Law alumni